The Law Society of Kenya (LSK) is an organization mandated to advise and assist members of the legal profession, the government and the larger public in all matters relating to the administration of justice in Kenya.

It was established by an Act of Parliament – The Law Society of Kenya Act (Chapter 18 of the Laws of Kenya). The current LSK Act, came into effect in 1992.
The LSK has over 20,000 practicing advocates in its membership.

LSK Membership
The Law Society of Kenya membership consists of all practicing advocates in Kenya, numbering over seventeen thousand. By law, one must be a member of the Law Society of Kenya in order to practice as an advocate of the High Court of Kenya.

The Law Society of Kenya also has special and honorary membership. Special membership is conferred upon application to persons who possess the requisite legal qualifications. Honorary membership is conferred by the Council on any person whom it may think fit so to honor. Honorary membership may be conferred for life or for such period as the Council may in any case deem appropriate

The Law Society of Kenya and its members are also members of the East Africa Law Society, the African Bar Association, the Commonwealth Lawyers Association, the Criminal Bar Association, and the International Bar Association.

Who can be a member of the Law Society of Kenya
1. Any advocate who is a member of the society by virtue of section 28 of the Advocates act.

2. Any person admitted to membership of the society under section 6 of the Law Society of Kenya Act.

3. Any person elected as an honorary member of the society under section 7 of the Law Society of Kenya Act.

4. Any person who may have at any time previously been a member of the society and who complies with the regulations of the society for the time being in force.

5. Any of the following persons who applies for membership of the society in the prescribed manner may be admitted as a member of the society by the council:

 Any person mentioned in section 9 of the Advocates Act.
 Any other legally qualified person for the time being resident in Kenya.

6. Provided that no person who has been expelled from membership of the Society shall thereafter be admitted as a member thereof under this section   without the authority of a special resolution.

7. The council may elect as an honorary member of the society any person whom it may think fit so to honor, either for life or for such a period as the council may in any case deem appropriate.
Subject to the provision of the sections 27 and 28 of the Advocates Act, every member of the society shall pay the society such annual subscription as may be prescribed from time to time.

Benefits of LSK membership

Information
The LSK acts as an information channel keeping members and the wider profession informed of legal developments of interest via its networks.

Networking
The LSK is the perfect forum to strengthen connections with practitioners in Kenya. As a member of LSK you’re able to participate on committees, deliver topics at Law Society of Kenya conferences and seminars and take advantage of the Society’s networking opportunities.

Learning and Training
Each year some CLE events are staged around  Kenya, from specialist events that address numerous areas of practice. Expert practitioners and leading representatives from government and regulatory bodies present extensive programmes – where participants can get actively involved in discussion and debate.

LSK Blacklist
On 16 January 2012 the Law Society of Kenya(LSK) identified several public officials have been mentioned adversely in various reports on issues ranging from corruption to economic crimes. The LSK advised voters not to vote those mentioned in the report as they had previously compromised. The report was titled Realising Integrity Law:Walking the Talk

Chairpersons/Presidents
Below is a list of Chairpersons of the LSK:
 Humphrey Slade - 1949-1950
 N.S. Mangat, Q.C. - 1950-1951
 L. Kaplan - 1951-1952
 J. Sorabjee, Q.C. - 1952-1953
 C.F. Schermburucker - 1953-1954
 J.M. Nzareth, Q.C. - 1954-1955
 Ivor Lean, Q.C. - 1955-1956
 Justice Madan, Q.C. - 1956-1957
 J.A. Mackie-Robertson, Q.C. - 1957-1958
 Justice Chanan Singh - 1958-1959
 J.O. O’Brien Kelly - 1959-1960
 Justice Madan - 1960-1961
 A.E. Hunter 1961-1962
 Satish Gautama 1962-1963
 Justice Harris 1963-1964
 B.T. Modi 1964-1965
 S.M.C. Thomson 1965-1966
 G.S. Sandhu 1966-1967
 K.B. Keith 1967-1968
 E.P. Nowrojee 1968-1969
 P. Le Pelley 1969-1970
 S.N. Waruhiu 1970-1972
 M.Z.A. Malik 1972-1973
 J.A. Couldrey 1973-1974
 Ramnik Shah 1974-1975
 S. Sangale 1975-1976
 P.J. Ransley 1976-1977
 K.C. Gautama 1977-1979
 S. Amos Wako 1979-1981
 Lee Muthoga 1981-1982
 Mutula Kilonzo 1982-1984
 G.B.M. Kariuki 1984-1986
 Joe Okwach 1986-1988
 Fred Ojiambo 1988-1990
 Paul Muite 1991-1993
 F.W. Kagwe (Ag) 1992-1993
 Willy Mutunga 1993-1995
 Paul Wamae 1995-1997
 Nzamba Kitonga 1997-1999
 Gibson Kamau Kuria 1999-2001
 Raychelle Omamo 2001-2003
 Ahmednasir M Abdullahi 2003-2005
 Tom Adhiambo Ojienda 2005-2007
 Okong'o Omogeni 2007-2010
 Kenneth W. Akide 2010-2012
 Eric Kyalo Mutua 2012-2016
 Isaac E.N Okero 2016-2018
 Allen Waiyaki Gichuhi 2018-2020
Nelson Havi - 2020 - 2021
Eric Theuri - 2022 - 2024

References

African bar associations
2012 in Kenya
Kenya articles by importance
Legal organisations based in Kenya